Video mode can mean:
 Operation mode used in DVD recorder to create DVD-Video compatible discs. See also VR Mode
 Operation mode in frame buffer display modes
 IBM PC compatible video display mode set by BIOS interrupt call INT 10H